The Bristol and Bath Tennis Club was founded in 1985 by a small group of enthusiasts with the aim of providing a real tennis facility for people in Bristol, Bath, and adjacent areas in the southwest of England.

Their efforts culminated in the construction of a new real tennis court situated on Clifton College's Beggar Bush Playing Fields during 1997. Since then several hundred players have sampled the game for the first time, and the club has an established membership approaching 350.

References

External links
 Bristol and Bath Tennis Club website

Real tennis venues
Sport in Bath, Somerset
Sport in Bristol
Sports venues completed in 1985
1985 establishments in England
Tennis clubs